Best of 4Minute is the first Japanese compilation album by the South Korean girl group 4Minute. It is composed of all the Japanese tracks released by the group since their debut in Japan. It was released on September 26, 2012 in three different editions: 2 limited CD+DVD (Type A with a live event and Type B with all Japanese music videos) and a Regular edition.

Background and composition
The album includes tracks released by the group since their debut in Japan in 2010, all singles, some b-sides and album tracks. The album was released in three different editions: 2 CD+DVD, Type A includes the live event "4Minute Live Energy Vol.2 "Diamond" 2010.12.04 Zepp Tokyo", Type B has all Japanese music videos released at the date and a regular edition, with only the CD itself. The album also includes the song "Goodbye", b-side of the single "I My Me Mine", two songs from the album Diamond, "Can't Make Up My Mind" and "December" and a Japanese version of their debut song "Hot Issue", previously unreleased. The art covers of the album features individual photos of the girls and jacket covers of the group's past releases.

Singles
The album includes five singles that were not included in any album or compilation release:

The first single is the song "Dreams Come True", which was released as a double A-side single along with "First". "First" was included on the group's Japanese debut album Diamond. The single was released in October 24, 2010 and sold around 6,500 copies of the physical single at the date.

The second single is the song "Why", released on March 9, 2011. At the date, it is the most successfully selling single of the group with around 15,000 copies sold physically. It ranked #17 on Oricon's weekly chart. The song was chosen as theme song for the Japanese drama Akuto~Juuhanzai Sousa Han. Promotions ended quickly due to the 2011 Tōhoku earthquake and tsunami, and the group's only TV performance was on Happy Music.

The third single is a Japanese version of the song "Heart to Heart", released on September 7, 2011, alongside the group's first DVD Emerald of 4minute. The physical single sold around 10,000 copies at the date and reached number 18 on the Oricon weekly chart. The original version of the song is the first single of the group's first Korean studio album 4minutes Left.  The song's music video was released on August 15, in the Universal Music Japan's official YouTube account. It differs from the Korean music video, omitting a storyline and showing more solo and choreographed dance shots.

The fourth single is the song "Ready Go", released on December 7, 2011. The full music video was released exclusively on the music channel MTV Japan on November 11. The physical single sold around 8,000 copies, peaking at No. 23 on Oricon's weekly singles chart. It also charted at No. 1 on Gaon's international singles chart and No. 100 on the RIAJ Digital Track Chart. The B-Side is a Japanese version of "Sweet Suga Honey!", previously released on 4Minute's first Korean album 4minutes Left. "Ready Go" was used as opening theme song for the Japanese drama Welcome to the El-Palacio.

The fifth and final single is the song "Love Tension", released on August 22, 2012. The music video premiered exclusively on MTV Japan on August 4. The physical single was the most unsuccessfully selling single of the group in Japan, with 3,701 copies sold in the first week. It ranked No. 26 on Oricon's weekly singles chart. The B-side, a Japanese version of "Volume Up", was also included on the album. The original version of the song is the lead single of the group's third mini album of same name.

Track listing

Chart performance

Oricon

Release history

References

External links 
 
 
 

2012 compilation albums
4Minute albums
Universal Music Japan albums
Japanese-language albums